This article contains information about the literary events and publications of 2005.

Events
January 16 – This is the 400th anniversary of Miguel de Cervantes' publication of the first part of Don Quixote in Spain.
February 25 – Canada Reads selects Rockbound by Frank Parker Day as the novel to be read across the nation.
March 26 – The classic U.K. science fiction series Doctor Who returns to television with a script by Russell T Davies, the executive producer.
April 23 – The Grande Bibliothèque at the Bibliothèque et Archives nationales du Québec is officially opened. It actually opens on April 30.
June 13 – The poet Dannie Abse is injured and his wife Joan killed in an accident on the M4 in South Wales.
August 15 – An integrated National Library of Norway opens to readers in Oslo for the first time.

New books

Fiction
Tariq Ali – A Sultan in Palermo
Rajaa Alsanea – Girls of Riyadh (بنات الرياض, Banat al-Riyadh)
Avi – Never Mind
Tash Aw – The Harmony Silk Factory
Steve Aylett – Lint
Doreen Baingana – Tropical Fish (short stories)
John Banville – The Sea
Sebastian Barry – A Long Long Way
Nelson Bond – Other Worlds Than Ours
Dionne Brand – What We All Long For
Orson Scott Card
Magic Street
Shadow of the Giant
Rita Chowdhury – Deo Langkhui
Wendy Coakley-Thompson – What You Won't Do for Love
Eoin Colfer – Artemis Fowl and the Opal Deception
Bernard Cornwell – The Pale Horseman
Colin Cotterill – Thirty-Three Teeth
Robert Crais – The Forgotten Man
Mitch Cullin – A Slight Trick of the Mind
Michael Cunningham – Specimen Days
Rana Dasgupta – Tokyo Cancelled
Lindsey Davis – See Delphi and Die
Abha Dawesar – Babyji
L. Sprague de Camp – Years in the Making: the Time-Travel Stories of L. Sprague de Camp
Troy Denning
The Joiner King
The Swarm War
The Unseen Queen
Bret Easton Ellis – Lunar Park
Alicia Erian – Towelhead
Steve Erickson – Our Ecstatic Days
Sebastian Faulks – Human Traces
Amanda Filipacchi – Love Creeps
Jonathan Safran Foer – Extremely Loud & Incredibly Close
Nicci French – Catch Me When I Fall
Gayleen Froese – Touch
Cornelia Funke – Inkspell
David Gibbins – Atlantis
Kate Grenville – The Secret River (Melbourne)
Abdulrazak Gurnah – Desertion
Margaret Peterson Haddix – Among the Enemy
Joanne Harris – Gentlemen & Players
Carl Hiaasen – Flush
Charlie Higson – SilverFin
Peter Hobbs – The Short Day Dying
John Irving – Until I Find You
Kazuo Ishiguro – Never Let Me Go
Uzodinma Iweala – Beasts of No Nation
Raymond Khoury – The Last Templar
Stephen King – The Colorado Kid
Dean Koontz – Velocity
Elizabeth Kostova – The Historian
Stieg Larsson – The Girl with the Dragon Tattoo
Marina Lewycka – A Short History of Tractors in Ukrainian
Yiyun Li – A Thousand Years of Good Prayers (short stories)
James Luceno
Dark Lord: The Rise of Darth Vader
Labyrinth of Evil
Mike McCormack – Notes from a Coma
Ian McEwan – Saturday
Elizabeth McKenzie – Stop That Girl
Kevin MacNeil – The Stornoway Way
Gregory Maguire – Son of a Witch
Gabriel Garcia Marquez – Memories of My Melancholy Whores
Stephenie Meyer – Twilight
David Michaels – Tom Clancy's Splinter Cell: Operation Barracuda
Robert Muchamore
Maximum Security
The Killing
Péter Nádas – Parallel Stories
Garth Nix – Drowned Wednesday
Chuck Palahniuk – Haunted
Christopher Paolini – Eldest
Robert B. Parker – School Days
Ruth Rendell – End in Tears
Salman Rushdie – Shalimar the Clown
Darren Shan – Lord Loss (first of The Demonata series)
Michael Slade – Swastika
Zadie Smith – On Beauty
Olen Steinhauer – 36 Yalta Boulevard
Matthew Stover – Star Wars Episode III: Revenge of the Sith
Thomas Sullivan – Second Soul
Jean-François Susbielle – La Morsure du dragon
Vikas Swarup – Q & A
Rupert Thomson – Divided Kingdom
Harry Turtledove (editor) – The Enchanter Completed: A Tribute Anthology for L. Sprague de Camp
Andrew Vachss – Two Trains Running
Catherynne M. Valente – Yume No Hon: The Book of Dreams
Michal Viewegh – Lekce tvůrčího psaní
Narayan Wagle – Palpasa Cafe (पल्पसा क्याफे)
David Weber – At All Costs
Samantha Weinberg – The Moneypenny Diaries: Guardian Angel
Kirby Wright – Punahou Blues
Markus Zusak – The Book Thief

Children and young people
David Almond – Clay
Charlie Jane Anders – Choir Boy
Jackie French – They Came on Viking Ships
Jonathon Scott Fuqua – King of the Pygmies
John Green – Looking for Alaska
Charlie Higson – Silverfin
Julius Lester – The Old African
Claire and Monte Montgomery - Hubert Invents the Wheel
Jenny Nimmo – Charlie Bone and the Castle of Mirrors
Jane O'Connor – Fancy Nancy (first in a series of over 70 books)
Margie Palatini (with Barry Moser) – The Three Silly Billies
Peter Parnell and Justin Richardson – And Tango Makes Three
Philip Reeve – Infernal Devices
Rick Riordan – The Lightning Thief
J. K. Rowling – Harry Potter and the Half-Blood Prince
Lemony Snicket – The Penultimate Peril
Dugald Steer (with Nghiem Ta, etc.) – Wizardology: The Book of the Secrets of Merlin
Jonathan Stroud – Ptolemy's Gate
Scott Westerfeld – Uglies (first in the Uglies series of four books)
Markus Zusak – The Book Thief

Drama
Catherine Filloux – Lemkin's House
debbie tucker green
stoning mary
generations
Oleg Kagan – The Black Hat
Carlos Lacamara – Nowhere on the Border
The Los Angeles Theatre Ensemble – Wounded
Peter Morris – Guardians
Vern Thiessen – Shakespeare's Will
Laura Wade
Colder Than Here
Breathing Corpses
Vincent Woods – A Cry from Heaven

Poetry

Carol Ann Duffy – Rapture

Non-fiction
Matthew Bortolin – The Dharma of Star Wars
Edwin Bryant – Indo-Aryan Controversy: Evidence and inference in Indian history
Francis Chalifour – After
Jung Chang & Jon Halliday – Mao: The Unknown Story
Theodore Dalrymple – Our Culture, What's Left of It: The Mandarins and the Masses
Michel Déon – Horseman, Pass By! (Cavalier, passe ton chemin!)
Jared Diamond – Collapse: How Societies Choose to Fail or Succeed
Joan Didion – The Year of Magical Thinking
Robert Fisk – The Great War for Civilisation: The Conquest of the Middle East
Randy Grim – Miracle Dog
John Grogan – Marley & Me
Michael Gross – 740 Park: The Story of the World's Richest Apartment Building
Adam Hochschild – Bury the Chains
Tom Holland – Persian Fire: The First World Empire and the Battle for the West
Tony Judt – Postwar: A History of Europe Since 1945
W. Chan Kim and Renée Mauborgne – Blue Ocean Strategy
Lawrence M. Krauss – Hiding in the Mirror
Mark Levin – Men In Black: How The Supreme Court Is Destroying America
Alexander Masters – Stuart: A Life Backwards
Azadeh Moaveni – Lipstick Jihad
Peter C. Newman – The Secret Mulroney Tapes: Unguarded Confessions of a Prime Minister
Lisa Randall – Warped Passages
Paul A. Robinson – Queer Wars
Michael Ruhlman and Brian Polcyn – Charcuterie: The Craft of Salting, Smoking and Curing
James S. Shapiro – 1599: A Year in the Life of William Shakespeare
Masamune Shirow – Ghost in the Shell 2: Man/Machine Interface
Rebecca Solnit – A Field Guide to Getting Lost
David Southwell – Secrets and Lies
James B. Stewart – DisneyWar

Deaths
January 4 – Humphrey Carpenter, English biographer, children's fiction writer and radio broadcaster (born 1946)
January 7 – Pierre Daninos, French novelist (born 1913)
January 14 – Charlotte MacLeod, American mystery writer (born 1922)
January 15
Walter Ernsting, German science fiction author (born 1920)
Elizabeth Janeway, American feminist author (born 1913)
January 19 – K. Sello Duiker, South African novelist (suicide, born 1974)
January 20 – Roland Frye, American theologian and critic (born 1921)
January 21
John L. Hess, American journalist and critic (born 1917)
Theun de Vries, Dutch writer and poet (born 1907)
January 24 – Vladimir Savchenko, Ukrainian science fiction writer (born 1933)
January 25 – Max Velthuijs, Dutch writer and illustrator (born 1923)
January 29 – Ephraim Kishon, Israeli satirist, dramatist, and screenwriter (born 1924)
February 10 – Arthur Miller, American playwright (born 1915)
February 11 – Jack L. Chalker, American science fiction writer (born 1944)
February 20 – Hunter S. Thompson, American writer, creator of Gonzo journalism (born 1937)
February 21 – Guillermo Cabrera Infante, Cuban novelist (born 1929)
February 25 – Phoebe Hesketh, English poet (born 1909)
March 7 – Willis Hall, English playwright (born 1929)
March 8
Alice Thomas Ellis, English novelist, essayist and cookery book author (born 1932)
Anna Haycraft, English novelist (born 1932)
March 10 – Patience Gray, English cookery and travel writer (born 1917)
March 17 – Andre Norton, American science fiction writer (born 1912)
March 22 – Anthony Creighton, English playwright (born 1922)
March 30 – Robert Creeley, American poet (born 1926)
April 5 – Saul Bellow, Canadian writer (born 1915)
April 7 – Yvonne Vera, Zimbabwean novelist (meningitis, born 1964)
April 26 – Augusto Roa Bastos, Paraguayan novelist (born 1917)
May 7 – Tristan Egolf, American novelist (suicide, born 1971)
June 9 – Hovis Presley, English poet (heart attack, born 1960)
June 10 – Nick Darke, Cornish playwright (cancer, born 1948)
June 14 – Norman Levine, Canadian short story writer (born 1923)
June 16 – Enrique Laguerre, Puerto Rican novelist (born 1905)
June 20 – Larry Collins, American novelist (born 1929)
June 22 – William Donaldson, English satirist (born 1935)
June 27 – Shelby Foote, American novelist (born 1916)
June 28 – Philip Hobsbaum, Scottish poet and critic (born 1932)
June 30 – Christopher Fry, English dramatist (born 1907)
July 6
Evan Hunter, American novelist (born 1926)
Claude Simon, French Nobel laureate in literature (born 1913)
July 7 – Gustaf Sobin, American poet (born 1935)
July 17 – Gavin Lambert, English novelist and biographer (born 1924)
July 19 – Edward Bunker, American crime writer (born 1933)
August 9 – Judith Rossner, American novelist (born 1935)
August 16 – William Corlett, English author and playwright (born 1938)
August 21 – Dahlia Ravikovitch, Israeli poet (born 1036)
August 29 – Sybil Marshall, English novelist (born 1913)
September 3 – R. S. R. Fitter, English nature writer (born 1913)
September 26 – Helen Cresswell, English children's writer (born 1934)
September 27
Ronald Pearsall, English writer (born 1927)
Mary Lee Settle, American novelist (born 1918)
October 2 – August Wilson, American playwright (born 1945)
October 17 – Ba Jin (巴金), Chinese novelist (born 1904)
October 31 – Amrita Pritam, Indian Punjabi poet and novelist (born 1919)
November 1 – Michael Thwaites, Australian poet (born 1915)
November 2 – Gordon A. Craig, Scottish historian
November 4 – Michael G. Coney, Canadian science-fiction writer (born 1932)
November 5 – John Fowles, English writer (born 1926)
November 21 – Aileen Fox, English archaeologist (born 1907)
November 26 – Stan Berenstain, American children's writer and illustrator (born 1923)
December 1 – Mary Hayley Bell, dramatist
December 2 – Christine Pullein-Thompson, English novelist (born 1925)
December 9 – Robert Sheckley, American short story writer (born 1928)
December 15 – Julián Marías, Spanish philosopher and author (born 1914)
December 16 – Kenneth Bulmer, English novelist and short story writer (born 1921)

Awards
Nobel Prize in Literature: Harold Pinter
Camões Prize: Lygia Fagundes Telles

Australia
The Australian/Vogel Literary Award: Andrew T. O'Connor, Tuvalu
C. J. Dennis Prize for Poetry: M. T. C. Cronin, 
Kenneth Slessor Prize for Poetry: Samuel Wagan Watson, Smoke Encrypted Whispers
Miles Franklin Award: Andrew McGahan, The White Earth

Canada
Governor General's Award for English-language fiction: David Gilmour, A Perfect Night to Go to China
Griffin Poetry Prize: Roo Borson, Short Journey Upriver Towards Oishida and Charles Simic, Selected Poems: 1963-2003
Hugo Award for Best Novel: Susanna Clarke, Jonathan Strange & Mr Norrell
Scotiabank Giller Prize: David Bergen, The Time in Between
Edna Staebler Award for Creative Non-Fiction: Anne Coleman, I'll Tell You a Secret

Sweden

Astrid Lindgren Memorial Award: Philip Pullman and Ryōji Arai

United Kingdom
Bruntwood Prize for Playwriting (first award): Duncan Macmillan, Monster
Caine Prize for African Writing: S. A. Afolabi, "Monday Morning"
Carnegie Medal for children's literature: Mal Peet, Tamar
Cholmondeley Award: Jane Duran, Christopher Logue, M. R. Peacocke, Neil Rollinson
Commonwealth Writers Prize: Andrea Levy, Small Island
Dagger of Daggers: John le Carré, The Spy Who Came in from the Cold (1963)
Eric Gregory Award: Melanie Challenger, Carolyn Jess, Luke Kennard, Jaim Smith
James Tait Black Memorial Prize for biography: Sue Prideaux, Edvard Munch: Behind the Scream
James Tait Black Memorial Prize for fiction: Ian McEwan, Saturday
Man Booker International Prize (first award): Ismail Kadare
Man Booker Prize: John Banville, The Sea
Samuel Johnson Prize: Jonathan Coe, Like A Fiery Elephant: The Story of B. S. Johnson
Orange Prize for Fiction: Lionel Shriver, We Need to Talk About Kevin
Somerset Maugham Award: Justin Hill, Passing Under Heaven; Maggie O'Farrell, The Distance Between Us
Whitbread Book of the Year Award: Hilary Spurling, Matisse the Master: The Conquest of Colour 1909-1954

United States
Aiken Taylor Award for Modern American Poetry: B. H. Fairchild
Agnes Lynch Starrett Poetry Prize: Rick Hilles, Brother Salvage: Poems
Arthur Rense Prize: Daniel Hoffman
Bollingen Prize for Poetry: Jay Wright
Brittingham Prize in Poetry: Susanna Childress, Jagged with Love
Compton Crook Award: Tamara Siler Jones, Ghosts in the Snow
Frost Medal: Marie Ponsot
Hugo Award: Susanna Clarke, Jonathan Strange & Mr Norrell
Lambda Literary Awards: Multiple categories; see 2005 Lambda Literary Awards.
National Book Award for Poetry: W. S. Merwin, Migration: New and Selected Poems
National Book Critics Circle Award: to War Trash by Ha Jin
Newbery Medal: Cynthia Kadohata, Kira-Kira
PEN/Faulkner Award for Fiction: to The March by E.L. Doctorow
Pulitzer Prize for Drama: John Patrick Shanley, Doubt: A Parable
Pulitzer Prize for Fiction: Marilynne Robinson, Gilead
Pulitzer Prize for Poetry: Ted Kooser, Delights & Shadows
Wallace Stevens Award: Gerald Stern
Whiting Awards:
Fiction: Sarah Shun-lien Bynum, Nell Freudenberger, Seth Kantner, John Keene (fiction/poetry)
Plays: Rinne Groff
Poetry: Thomas Sayers Ellis, Ilya Kaminsky, Dana Levin, Spencer Reece, Tracy K. Smith

Other
International Dublin Literary Award: Edward P. Jones, The Known World
German Book Prize (first award): Arno Geiger, Es geht uns gut (We Are Doing Fine)
Commander of the Ordre des Arts et des Lettres: Patti Smith

See also
List of years in literature
Literature
Poetry
List of literary awards
List of poetry awards
2005 in Australian literature

Notes

References

 
Literature
Years of the 21st century in literature